Nutella is a brand of sweetened hazelnut cocoa spread. Nutella is manufactured by the Italian company Ferrero and was first introduced in 1964, although its first iteration dates to 1963.

History 
Pietro Ferrero owned a bakery in Alba, an Italian town known for the production of hazelnuts. In 1946, he sold the initial  batch of Pasta Gianduja, derived from Gianduja. Originally sold as a solid block, Ferrero started to sell a creamy version in 1951 as Supercrema gianduja.

In 1963, Ferrero's son Michele Ferrero revamped Supercrema gianduja with the intention of marketing it throughout Europe. Its composition was modified, and it was renamed "Nutella". The first jar of Nutella left the factory in Alba on April 20, 1964. The product was an instant success and remains widely popular.

In 2012, French senator Yves Daudigny proposed a tax increase on palm oil from €100 to €400 per tonne. At 20 percent, palm oil is one of Nutella's main ingredients, and the tax was dubbed "the Nutella tax" in the media.

On 14 May 2014, Poste italiane issued a 50th anniversary Nutella commemorative stamp. The 70 Euro cent stamp was designed by Istituto Poligrafico e Zecca dello Stato and features a jar of Nutella on a golden background. Ferrero held a Nutella Day on 17 and 18 May to celebrate the anniversary.

Ingredients 

The main ingredients of Nutella are sugar and palm oil (greater than 50%). It also contains hazelnut at 13%, cocoa solids, and skimmed milk. In the United States and the United Kingdom, Nutella contains soy products. Nutella is marketed as "hazelnut cream" in many countries. Under Italian law, it cannot be labeled as a "chocolate cream", as it does not meet minimum cocoa solids concentration criteria.  Ferrero uses 25 percent of the global supply of hazelnuts, though not all of this is used exclusively in Nutella.

In November 2017, the company modified the recipe slightly, increasing the sugar and skimmed milk powder content. Since the colour of the product is lighter in tone, the Hamburg Consumer Protection Center estimated that the cocoa content was also reduced. Some news outlets reported that the modification of the recipe led to consumers' being "outraged" or "going nuts".

The traditional Piedmont recipe, gianduja, was a mixture containing approximately 71.5% hazelnut paste and 19.5% chocolate. It was developed in Piedmont, Italy, due to a lack of cocoa beans after post-war rationing reduced availability of the raw material.

Ingredients by country 
Many countries have a different ingredient list for the Nutella formula.

Australia
Sugar, palm oil, hazelnuts (13%), skim milk powder (8.7%) cocoa powder (7.4%), non-fat milk solids, emulsifier (soy lecithin), flavour (vanillin).

Canada

Sugar, modified palm oil, hazelnuts, cocoa, skim milk powder, whey powder, lecithin, vanillin.

Germany
Ferrero has confirmed that it has changed the recipe of its chocolate and hazelnut spread – sparking a huge backlash among fans of the brand.

India
Sugar, palm oil, hazelnuts (13%), skim cow milk powder (8.7%), low fat cocoa powder (7.4%), emulsifier (Lecithin - INS 322), contains added flavour (nature identical flavouring substance - vanillin).

Italy
Sugar, palm oil, hazelnuts (13%), fat-reduced cocoa powder (7.4%), skimmed milk powder (5%), whey powder, emulsifier (lecithins) (soy), flavourant (vanillin).

United Kingdom
Sugar, palm oil, hazelnuts (13%), skimmed milk powder (8.7%), fat-reduced cocoa (7.4%), emulsifier: lecithins (soya), vanillin.

United States
Sugar, palm oil, hazelnuts, cocoa, skim milk, reduced minerals whey (milk), lecithin as emulsifier (soy), vanillin: an artificial flavor.

Nutrition 

Nutella contains 10.4 percent of saturated fat and 58% of processed sugar by weight. A two-tablespoon (37-gram) serving of Nutella contains 200 calories, including 99 calories from 11 grams of fat (3.5 g of which are saturated) and 80 calories from 21 grams of sugar. The spread also contains 15 mg of sodium and 2 g of protein per serving (for reference a Canadian serving size is 1 tablespoon or 19 grams).

Production 

Nutella is produced in various facilities. In the North American market, it is produced at a plant in Brantford, Ontario, Canada and more recently in San José Iturbide, Guanajuato, Mexico.

For Australia and New Zealand, Nutella has been manufactured in Lithgow, New South Wales, since the late 1970s.

Two of the four Ferrero plants in Italy produce Nutella, in Alba, Piedmont, and in Sant'Angelo dei Lombardi in Campania. In France, a production facility is located in Villers-Écalles. For Eastern Europe (including Southeast Europe, Poland, Turkey, Czech Republic and Slovakia) and South Africa, it is produced in Warsaw and Manisa. For Germany and northern Europe, Nutella is produced at the Ferrero plant in Stadtallendorf, which has been in existence since 1956. Nutella entered the Russian market and also has a production plant in Vladimir.

Ferrero also has a plant in Poços de Caldas, Brazil, which supplies the Brazilian market, with part of the production being exported overseas. It is also manufactured in Turkey and exported to countries like India.

Global production in 2013 was about 350,000 tonnes.

Processing
Nutella is described as a chocolate and hazelnut spread, although it is mostly made of sugar and palm oil. The manufacturing process for this food item is very similar to a generic production of chocolate spread. Nutella is made from sugar, modified palm oil, hazelnuts, cocoa powder, skimmed milk powder, whey powder, soy lecithin, and vanillin.

The process of making this spread begins with the extraction of cocoa powder from the cocoa bean. These cocoa beans are harvested from cocoa trees and are left to dry for about ten days before being shipped for processing. Typically, cocoa beans contain approximately 50 percent of cocoa butter; therefore, they must be roasted to reduce the cocoa bean into a liquid form. This step is not sufficient for turning cocoa bean into a chocolate paste because it solidifies at room temperature and would not be spreadable. After the initial roast, the liquid paste is sent to presses, which are used to squeeze the butter out of the cocoa bean. The final products are round discs of chocolate made of pure compressed cocoa. The cocoa butter is transferred elsewhere so it can be used in other products.

The second process involves the hazelnuts. Once the hazelnuts have arrived at the processing plant, a quality control is issued to inspect the nuts so they are suitable for processing. A guillotine is used to chop the nuts to inspect the interior. After this process, the hazelnuts are cleaned and roasted. A second quality control is issued by a computer-controlled blast of air, which removes the bad nuts from the batch. This ensures that each jar of Nutella is uniform in its look and taste. Approximately 50 hazelnuts can be found in each jar of Nutella, as claimed by the company.

The cocoa powder is then mixed with the hazelnuts along with sugar, vanillin and skim milk in a large tank, until it becomes a paste-like spread. Modified palm oil is then added to help retain the solid phase of the Nutella at room temperature, which substitutes for the butter found in the cocoa bean. Whey powder is then added to the mix to act as a binder for the paste. Whey powder is an additive commonly used in spreads to prevent the coagulation of the product, because it stabilizes the fat emulsions. Similarly, lecithin, a form of a fatty substance found in animal and plant tissues, is added to help emulsify the paste, as it promotes homogenized mixing of the different ingredients, allowing the paste to become spreadable. It also aids the lipophilic properties of the cocoa powder, which, again, keeps the product from separating. Vanillin is added to enhance the sweetness of the chocolate. The finished product is then packaged.

Storage
The label states that Nutella does not need to be refrigerated. This is because the large quantity of sugar in the product acts as a preservative to prevent the growth of microorganisms. More specifically, the sugar acts as a preservative by binding the water in the product, which prevents the microorganisms from growing. Refrigeration causes Nutella to harden, because it contains fats from the hazelnuts. When nut fats are placed in cold temperatures, they become too hard to spread. Hazelnuts contain almost 91 percent monounsaturated fat, which are known to be liquid at room temperature and solidify at refrigerator temperatures. Room temperature allows the product to have a smooth and spreadable consistency, because the monounsaturated oils from the hazelnut are liquid in this state. In addition, the palm oil used in Nutella does not require refrigeration, because it contains high amounts of saturated fat and resists becoming rancid. The remaining ingredients in Nutella, such as cocoa, skimmed milk powder, soy lecithin, and vanillin, also do not require refrigeration.

Class action lawsuit
In the United States, Ferrero was sued in a class action for false advertising leading to consumer inferences that Nutella has nutritional and health benefits (from advertising claims that Nutella was "part of a nutritious breakfast").

In April 2012, Ferrero agreed to pay a $3 million settlement (up to $4 per jar for up to five jars per customer). The settlement also required Ferrero to make changes to Nutella's labeling and marketing, including television commercials and their website.

Gallery

See also
 Ferrero Rocher
 List of brand name condiments
 Nocilla
 Nudossi
Nutellagate
 İzmir Bomb Kurabiye

References

External links

 

Italian cuisine
Cuisine of Piedmont
Spreads (food)
Ferrero SpA brands
Italian brands
Products introduced in 1964
Brand name condiments